The 1896 United States presidential election in Indiana took place on November 3, 1896. All contemporary 45 states were part of the 1896 United States presidential election. State voters chose fifteen electors to the Electoral College, which selected the president and vice president.

Indiana was won by the Republican nominees, former Ohio Governor William McKinley and his running mate Garret Hobart of New Jersey.

Results

See also
 United States presidential elections in Indiana

Notes

References

Indiana
1896
1896 Indiana elections